Oceanic House is a grade II listed former office building at 1 Cockspur Street, in the City of Westminster, London. It was designed by Henry Tanner junior and was completed in 1907. It was originally the London headquarters of the White Star Line from which tickets for the RMS Titanic were sold. It later became a Barclays Bank, was used by the British Ministry of Defence, and became the Texas Embassy Cantina restaurant which closed in 2012. In 2016 it was converted into six luxury apartments and a duplex penthouse. It is owned by the Crown Estate.

References

External links

Grade II listed buildings in the City of Westminster
Crown Estate
Houses completed in 1907
White Star Line
RMS Titanic
Grade II listed office buildings